Paddy Meehan was an Irish footballer who played as a forward.

Meehan was capped once for the Republic of Ireland national team at senior level. He made his debut in a 5–2 defeat to the Netherlands on 8 April 1934.

At club level, Meehan played for Drumcondra between 1933 and 1939 then moved to Bray Unknowns for two seasons before moving back to Drums in 1941.

References

External links
 Profile from soccerscene.ie
 

Republic of Ireland association footballers
Association football forwards
Republic of Ireland international footballers
Drumcondra F.C. players
Year of birth missing